Akovos is a mountain village and a community in the municipal unit of Falaisia, southwestern Arcadia, Greece. It is situated in the foothills of the Taygetus mountains.

Its nearest villages are Dyrrachio and Leptini. In 2001 its population was 182 for the village, and 202 for the community, including the village Goupata.

History

Theodoros Kolokotronis married and settled for several years in Akovos. In 1825, he fought a battle nearby in the village of Drampala against Ibrahim Pasha of Egypt. While waiting in Akovos for Ibrahim's forces, Kolokotronis vowed with the villagers that he would build a larger church, and he carved his initials into a stone of the Agia Sotira church. The anniversary of the battle is celebrated by the town on the day of the Pentecost. , his home is the village's Cultural Centre.

Overview
In keeping with its name for water, the village has a number of water fountains, one of which is named "Neraidovrysi".

Population

Goupata
Part of the Akovos community, Goupata is a small settlement of less than 50 people near the village of Kamara and the Kato Gianei settlement.

Religion
One of the churches in Akovos is Saint Nicholas Orthodox Church, an Eastern Orthodox church.

There are many chapels in the village and they hold celebrations throughout the years. A festival is held on St. George's Day, due to the historic tradition of Kourbani. It was started in the village by Kolokotroni's father-in-law, who offered a calf each year to St. George. Now, only visitors have right to the food from a donated calf. There are also festivals on the day of the Pentecost in an Agia Triada. Festivals are also held at the church of Virgin Mary and Agia  Paraskevi. Another chapel is Agia Solomoni.

People from Akovos
 Maria Menounos' father, Costas Menounos
 Sotirios Christopoulos

See also
List of settlements in Arcadia

References

External links
 Akovos (official site - Greek)
History and Information about Akovos (Greek)
A map of Akovos and the surrounding area with captions of historical info for the areas (Greek)

Falaisia
Populated places in Arcadia, Peloponnese